Lillianne Brown Leighton (May 17, 1874 – March 19, 1956), known professionally as Lillian Leighton, was an American silent film actress. Leighton started her career in Chicago. 

Leighton was born in Auroraville, Wisconsin, on May 17, 1874. She was a performer on stage and in vaudeville before she began working in films. She portrayed the Wicked Witch of the West in The Wonderful Wizard of Oz (1910).

She was signed in 1910 and starred in over 200 films before her retirement in 1940. Leighton died in Woodland Hills, Los Angeles, California on March 19, 1956, at the age of 81.

Selected filmography

References

External links

 
Picture Leighton

1874 births
1956 deaths
20th-century American actresses
Actresses from Wisconsin
American film actresses
American silent film actresses